Levoglucosan (C6H10O5) is an organic compound with a six-carbon ring structure formed from the pyrolysis of carbohydrates, such as starch and cellulose. As a result, levoglucosan is often used as a chemical tracer for biomass burning in atmospheric chemistry studies, particularly with respect to airborne particulate matter.  
Along with other tracers such as potassium, oxalate, and gaseous acetonitrile, levoglucosan has been shown to be highly correlated with regional fires. This is because the gas emitted by the pyrolysis of wood (biomass) contains significant amounts of levoglucosan.

Levoglucosan has been described as "an unequivocal biomass burning tracer" in the context of forest and brush fires. But the anhydrosugar has only been found detectable in low temperature samples (150-350 °C), meaning that its value as an indicator for smoke from controlled biomass combustion in, for instance, modern domestic wood stoves which operate at temperatures above 500 °C, is "very doubtful". Levoglucosan is a marker for coal combustion as well as wood.

The hydrolysis of levoglucosan generates the fermentable sugar glucose. Levoglucosan can be utilized in the synthesis of chiral polymers such as unhydrolysable glucose polymers.

References

Monosaccharides
Atmospheric chemistry
Heterocyclic compounds with 2 rings
Oxygen heterocycles
Polyols